National Route 478 is a national highway of Japan connecting between Miyazu, Kyoto and Kumiyama, Kyoto in Japan, with total length has .

References

478
Roads in Kyoto Prefecture